Alim is the first Iranian passive radar. Passive radars do not transmit. Instead, they detect and track objects by processing reflections from non-cooperative sources of illumination in the environment, such as commercial broadcast and communications signals.

Alim is cheaper and has lower maintenance cost than conventional radars because it lacks a transmitter and movable mechanical parts. It requires high processing power, as six levels of processing are needed to track targets. Other advantages include the ability to detect low RCS targets at low altitudes. Since it doesn't transmit, it is immune to anti radiation missiles such as American AGM-88 HARM, thus it can be deployed near enemy lines.

It was first seen in 2011 during the parade of Iranian armed forces. The radar has a range of between 250-300 km and is able to detect slow, low flying targets with relative ease.

Notes and references

See also
Military of Iran
Iranian military industry
Current Equipment of the Iranian Army
Iran Electronics Industries

External links
Picture
Picture

Ground radars
Passive radars
Post–Cold War military equipment of Iran
Military radars of Iran
Military equipment introduced in the 2010s